Shim Eun-woo (born Park So-ri, June 2, 1992) is a South Korean actress. She has starred in the Korean television series such as Wanted (2016), Suspicious Partner (2017), Radio Romance (2018), and Arthdal Chronicles (2019). She's best known as one of the main role, Min Hyun-seo in the smash-hit Korean drama, The World of the Married (2020) which is her first main role in a drama.

Personal life 
On March 8, 2021, a former middle school classmate of Shim made a post on an online community board, accusing the actress of school bullying. The former classmate alleged that while she had not suffered physical violence, she had been a victim of intense social ostracism and psychological bullying, and that Shim had taken the lead in subjecting her to extreme emotional abuse. Despite initially denying the accusations, Shim posted an official statement online, admitting to the school bullying, and apologizes for her behavior and wrongdoings. Shim revealed that prior to the statement, she met the classmate and her family in person to apologize.

Filmography

Film

Television series

References

External links 

 

1992 births
South Korean film actresses
South Korean television actresses
Living people